The Royal British Nurses' Association was founded in December 1887 by Ethel Bedford-Fenwick.

It described itself as a union or organisation of nurses for professional objects and campaigned for the establishment of a register of nurses. It wanted the training to last three years with national standards.

Princess Christian was the president from its foundation. In 1891, it received the prefix "Royal", and received a royal charter in 1892. In a speech she made in 1893, she made clear that the association was working towards "improving the education and status of those devoted and self-sacrificing women whose whole lives have been devoted to tending the sick, the suffering, and the dying". In the same speech, she warned about opposition and misrepresentation they had encountered. Although the association was in favour of registration as a means of enhancing and guaranteeing the professional status of trained nurses, its charter with the Privy Council allowed it to maintain a list rather than a formal register of nurses, but as the list had no formal status few nurses joined it, and the campaign for registration continued. The charter altered the constitution, and Mrs Bedford-Fenwick lost her permanent position.

Alice Ravenhill was the secretary of the association from 1894 to 1897. It set up a nurses' co-operative, the Chartered Nurses Association, in 1896. In 1905 it employed 120 nurses taking 7.5% of their earnings.

The passing of the Midwives Act 1902 encouraged the campaign for registration of nurses. The association helped to set up the Central Committee for the State Registration of Nurses in 1908.

The RBNA gradually went into decline following the Nurses Registration Act 1919; after six failed attempts between 1904 and 1918, the British parliament passed the bill allowing formal nurse registration. In 1925 it had about 5,000 members – around a fifth of the membership of the College of Nursing.

It was still in existence .

References

Medical associations based in the United Kingdom
Nursing organisations in the United Kingdom
1887 establishments in the United Kingdom
Organizations established in 1887
Organisations based in the United Kingdom with royal patronage